20 Fingers is the name of an American production team consisting of producers and DJs Carlos "Charlie Babie" Rosario, Manfred "Manny" Mohr, J.J. Flores and Onofrio Lollino. They were popular in the mid-1990s for producing a series of pop, dance and rap songs, many of which were distinguished by their humorous or risqué lyrics.

Musical career

1993–1994: Formation and "Short Dick Man"
Originally consisting of producers and DJ's Carlos "Charlie Babie" Rosario and Manfred "Manny" Mohr, the two later received help by friends Jonathan "JJ" Flores and Onofrio Lollino, who did some of their remixes. The artist name comes from the band members simply both having twenty fingers on their hands together.

On August 31, 1994, the group released their first single "Short Dick Man", featuring vocalist and rapper Gillette on Zoo Entertainment/SOS Records from their debut album On The Attack and More, which was controversial. The tune was a global success, particularly in France where it was a number one hit for three weeks. It peaked the top 5 in several European countries such as Italy and Germany also reached the top ten in other countries, including Austria, Belgium, New Zealand and Australia. It also reached number 14 in the U.S. and was considered a club success there.

The single, which involved a woman mocking the size of a man's penis, was also released in a clean version replacing the words "short dick" with "short short", which was also released under the censored title "Short Short Man" in the UK and several other countries. This new version, remixed by Strike, reached number 11, whereas the original only reached number 21 on the UK Singles Chart in 1994.

Mohr told the Los Angeles Times that the point of the song was to attract attention. "We figured there were all these songs by men bashing women and treating women like sex objects. So we decided a song that turned the tables on men might attract some attention". According to Gillette, the point of the song is to "strike back at all the women-bashing songs in pop, especially in rap". In the accompanying music video, images of Gillette singing "Short Dick Man" or "Short Short Man" on a beach alternate with those of a brawny man performing a photo session.

1994–1995: On the Attack and More and "Lick It"
20 Fingers released their debut studio album On the Attack and More in Poland and Germany. All eleven songs on this album were recorded with Gillette on guest vocals, except one song, the second single called "Lick It", which featured vocals of singer Roula. Their second single was another success in Europe and in clubs all around the world, which reached number 48 on the same chart.

In many other selected countries such as Brazil, Canada, Scandinavia, Australia, Japan, Portugal, Chile, South Korea or the U.S., the album has been released as Gillette's solo debut album with a similar front cover art, retitled On the Attack, the same eleven song track list with Gillette and excluding the eleventh song "Lick It". The duo scored another hit with their third and fourth singles "Mr. Personality" and "You're a Dog" with moderate success respectively, both with Gillette on featured vocals. In Germany and Poland, the two latter mentioned single releases were still credited under "20 Fingers feat. Gillette", while in the other countries as "Gillette". 20 Fingers also produced Max-A-Million's debut album Take Your Time.

In 1995, the group released their second self-titled studio album, 20 Fingers worldwide (or retitled simply as L'Album in France), which unlike the first album had the peculiarity of featuring different vocalists for almost every song. Next to all new original material, this album also consisted of three previously released 20 Fingers singles ("Short Dick Man", "Lick It", a remix of "Mr. Personality" called "Ugly") and two previously released Max-A-Million-produced singles "Take Your Time" and "Fat Boy". Other songs from their album were released as singles, credited only under the name of the featured vocalist, such as Nerada's "Position #9", Dania's "She Won't Know", Rochelle's "Praying for an Angel" and "Holding on to Love" or A' Lisa B's "I'm in Love".

The fact that all previous 20 Fingers singles, whether in their original or remixed form, are included on this album, it has been sometimes considered a compilation album and has been released under the title The Best of 20 Fingers in Asia. Their fifth single "Sex Machine" featuring singer Katrina (Roxanne Dawn) as well as Camille Alvey was released in 1995, which was another club hit but did not sell as well as its predecessors.

Max-A-Million's follow up third and fourth singles "Sexual Healing" and "Everybody's Groovin'" were also produced by 20 Fingers.

1996–1999: Group hiatus and remixes
A "Megamix" of their first three hits was also released as a single in France only, titled "Megamix Explosion". Since 1996, no single releases had been released under the 20 Fingers artist name and the group went on hiatus but continued producing music and pursuing solo careers. Babie remixed songs from Donna Lori, Soundmaster T and Natalie Hagan under the names "Charlie" and "Charlie Babie", while Mohr wrote songs for other artists. In 1996, 20 Fingers produced Gillette's second solo album Shake Your Money Maker and its three single releases "Do Fries Go with That Shake?", "Bounce" and "Shake Your Money Maker" in 1996 and 1997. The album and the three singles didn't chart well. In 1996, Mohr and Babie wrote and produced the single "Push, Push" for Katrina.

2000–present: Various productions
In 2000, Babie continued remixing songs from Destiny's Child, band members Beyoncé and Kelly Rowland, and Anastacia under the names "CB2000" and "Charlie's Nu Soul". Mohr and Babie wrote the song "Someone to Love Me" for singer La Rissa. In 2000, Mohr and Babie wrote and produced the song "Sex Tonight" from Gilette's third solo album Did I Say That, which was the first and only release out of the album and became a minor club hit in the U.S. In 2002 and 2003, Mohr and Babie wrote and produced the singles "Someone to Love" and "Gifted" for singers Angelina and Eyra Gail.

Artistry

Musical style
Musically 20 Fingers are known for their monoton and heavy beats, sounds and melodies. They mix dance with hip hop, pop, rock and Europop, which was popular in Europe, Oceania and South America in the 1990s. Lyrically, the group do not always follow a traditional verse-chorus structure such as in "Short Dick Man" or "Putang Ina Mo" (Tagalog for lit. "Your Mother is a Whore") with minimalistic vocals and often use simple repeatings such as "Bum, ba da da da da" ("Lick It"), "Barara bum bum bum" ("Sex Machine"), "Eeny, weeny, teeny, weeny" or "Don't, Don't, Don't, Do Do, Don't, Don't, Don't" ("Short Dick Man"), "Ay nako, putang ina mo!"/"Ina mo, ina mo, ina mo, ina mo" ("Putang Ina Mo") which led the songs to high recognition. The lyrics were distinguished by their humorous or risque lyrics, often sexually explicit including moaning, such as in their singles and "Position #9", similar to fellow Europop groups as E-Rotic, which often led to the songs becoming controversial. The first single "Short Dick Man", which involves a woman mocking the size of a man's penis, was later released in a clean version replacing the word "dick" with "short", with also a retitled censored title "Short Short Man". "Lick It" also had both edited and unedited versions released as well – the reason why 20 Fingers releases often had a Parental Advisory warning label. Their lyrics are sung in English, Spanish and Tagalog ("Putang Ina Mo").

Discography

Studio albums

Singles

Promotional singles

Album productions
1995: Max-A-Million – "Take Your Time"
1996: Gillette – "Shake Your Money Maker"

Single productions
1994: Max-A-Million – "Fat Boy"
1995: Max-A-Million – "Take Your Time (Do It Right)"
1995: Max-A-Million – "Sexual Healing"
1995: Max-A-Million – "Everybody's Groovin'"
1996: Katrina – "Push, Push"
1996: Gillette – "Shake Your Money Maker"
1996: Gillette – "Do Fries Go with That Shake?"
1997: Gillette – "Bounce"
2000: Gillette – "Sex Tonight"
2000: La Rissa – "Someone to Love Me"
2002: Eyra Gail – "Someone to Love"
2003: Angelina – "Gifted"

Music videos
1994: "Short Dick Man" (featuring Gillette)
1995: "Lick It" (featuring Roula)
1995: "Mr. Personality" (featuring Gillette)
1995: "Sex Machine" (featuring Katrina)

Notes

References

External links

Musical groups established in 1994
American dance music groups
American electronic music groups
American house music groups
American novelty song performers
American Eurodance groups